Amblyomma fimbriatum is a species of tick, a blood feeding parasite. The hosts include the goanna Varanus rosenbergi. A description nominating the taxon as Aponomma fimbriatum is also recognised.

References

Amblyomma
Species described in 1844